Tanganekald may be,

Tanganekald people
Tanganekald language